Alina Mungiu-Pippidi (born March 12, 1964) is a Romanian political scientist, academic, journalist and writer. A commentator on national politics, she is one of the civil society activists in post-1989 Romania, and, since 1990, an active contributor to Revista 22 weekly. Mungiu-Pippidi was a professor at the National School of Administration and Political Science in Bucharest, where she held courses on nationalism and electoral behavior. She has also lectured on post-Cold War transition to a market economy at several universities and business schools, including Harvard, Stanford, Princeton, Oxford, and the Stockholm School of Economics. She is the sister of film director Cristian Mungiu. In August 2007 she assumed a professorship in democracy studies at the Hertie School of Governance in Berlin, Germany. She founded and currently chairs the European Research Centre for Anti-Corruption and State-Building  and co-directs the EU FP7 five years research project ANTICORRP. In 2022 her work surpassed 5000 citations on Google Scholar, more than any other Romanian political scientist.

Biography
Born in Iași, she graduated from the Faculty of Medicine at the University of Iași. Starting in her student years, she began contributing essays of literary criticism to the magazine Cronica. After 1993, she worked for the Bucharest daily Express (until 1994). She was also the Romanian correspondent for the French newspaper Le Monde (1992–1993), and was employed as a news editor by the Romanian Television Company (1997–1998). In 2000, she authored a political science textbook for optional studies in high schools.

Mungiu-Pippidi holds a doctorate in social psychology. She visited Harvard University twice, first as a Fulbright fellow in the Government Department (1994–1995), and then as Shorenstein fellow at the John F. Kennedy School of Government (1998–1999).

In 1995, she founded Romania's largest think tank, the Romanian Academic Society (SAR), which issued several reports that were at the center of public debates (among others, they were credited with promoting steps that led the Parliament to ultimately adopt legislation regarding freedom of information, flat taxation, and other approaches to Romania's accession to the European Union). Mungiu-Pippidi is currently the SAR's president. She has also created and led the "Coalition for a Clean Parliament" (Coaliția pentru un Parlament Curat), which in the wake of the 2004 legislative elections, campaigned for candidates with reported moral problems (such as incompatibility or undergoing the investigation of judicial authorities) to be excluded from party lists (98 candidatures were withdrawn following the coalition's campaign).

Other activities
 European Council on Foreign Relations (ECFR), Member
 Editor, Romanian Journal of Political Science

Selected works

Books
Europe's Burden: Promoting Good Governance across Borders, Cambridge: Cambridge University Press, 2020 
The Quest for Good Governance: How Societies Develop Control of Corruption, Cambridge: Cambridge University Press, 2015 
A Tale of Two Villages. Coerced Modernization in the East European Countryside, Budapest: CEU Press, 2010 
Ottomans into Europeans: State and Institution Building in South-Eastern Europe (editor), London: Hurst; Boulder: Columbia University Press, 2010 
Nationalism after Communism. Lessons Learned from Nation and State Building, edited with Ivan Krastev, New York and Budapest: Central European University Press, 2004

Essays
Românii după '89 ("The Romanians after '89")
Doctrine politice. Concepte universale și realități românești ("Political doctrines. Universal concepts and Romanian realities"), 1998
Introducere în politologie. Manual opțional pentru liceu. ("An introduction to politology. Optional textbook for high school"), 2000
Romania after 2000. Threats and Challenges, 2002

Plays
Alina Mungiu-Pippidi has also written a number of plays, the most high-profile of which has been The Evangelists. The play, which was written in the 1990s, only debuted in Romania in 2005, where it sparked a considerable amount of controversy from Christian religious groups, who labeled it as "blasphemy" and "an attack against public morals". The play is based on the life of Jesus from a different point of view than that of the New Testament. Among its controversial scenes is one in which it is suggested that Mary Magdalene has oral sex with Jesus.

References

External links
 Page on the Hertie School website
 Research Gate page
 Resumé, at the Hertie School website
 List of Publications, at the Hertie School website
 Short biography, at Polirom
 Călin Ciobotari, "Alina Mungiu-Pippidi scandalizează 'dulcele târg al Ieșilor'", Flacăra Iașului, December 5, 2005
 Alina Mungiu-Pippidi – Evangheliștii, at Cartea Românească

1964 births
Living people
Writers from Iași
Alexandru Ioan Cuza University alumni
Romanian dramatists and playwrights
Harvard University people
Romanian magazine editors
Romanian sociologists
Romanian women sociologists
Romanian textbook writers
Academic staff of Hertie School
Romanian women essayists
Women dramatists and playwrights
Women magazine editors
Women textbook writers